Canton Alley is a historic alley between 7th and 8th Avenues South in Seattle's Chinatown–International District, in the United States. 

Framed by the East Kong Yick Building and West Kong Yick Building, Canton Alley was once an active neighborhood space with apartments on the upper floors and small shops along both sides. The alley was closed, repaved, and then reopened to the public in 2017 as part of a city reactivation project.

Canton Alley has been the site of has various community events and alley parties.

References

External links
 

Chinatown–International District, Seattle
Streets in Seattle